Bernardo Luis de Velasco y Huidobro (20 August 1742 – ) was a figure in the Spanish American wars of independence, the last Spanish governor of Paraguay and a commander of royalist military forces in the war. He was deposed by the congress celebrated in Asunción on 17 June 1811. He was born in Villadiego, Burgos, Spain.

Early life 
He was the second son of Miguel Gervasio de Velasco Fernández de Humada and Josefa Gabriela de Huidobro y Mier. He was baptized on 26 August in the same year of his birth in the Church of San Lorenzo Intramuros by one of his mother's relatives, the priest Pedro de Mier y Terán. He studied mathematics in Barcelona and at the age of 25 he entered the army. He participated from 1793 to 1795 in the War of the Pyrenees against the French troops.
He was a man of good appearance, courteous, affable, with classical and scientific knowledge. These characteristics, added to his military performance, figured as a favorable antecedent in the recommendation for his election among the candidates for governor of Paraguay written by his superior:
The candidate definitely had the conditions to carry out the Bourbonic ideal of militarizing the Indian civil administration in order to achieve order, prompt obedience and discipline. Velasco did not hide his fear of governing due to his self-descriptive lack of knowledge as recorded in an expedient from  cited by historian Ezequiel Abásolo:Due to the ruinous state of the Guarani reductions after the expulsion of the Jesuits, the King Charles IV decided to create, by a Royal Decree on 28 March 1803, a military and political government of the called "thirty towns of the old Guarani Missions". For that purpose, through Royal Cédula of 17 May 1803, he named him its governor. It consisted of a particular government as it was declared autonomous and independent from the provinces of Buenos Aires and Paraguay. The Lieutenant colonel Velasco arrived in Buenos Aires in January 1804 and on 2 August, the viceroy Joaquín del Pino authorized the cost of the trip with soldiers, an adviser, servants and luggage that would join him. After remaining stopped in Yapeyú due to the rain, Velasco arrived in Candelaria on 8 October 1804. On the next day, Santiago de Liniers, interim governor, transferred him the command.

Military and political governor of the towns of the Missions 
Velasco was promoted to colonel in June 1804. Taking into consideration the state of the militias and the Lusitan expansionism over the zone, he proposed himself the creation of a force of 600 well-armed and disciplined soldiers, but due to a series of factors this could not overcome the third part. Another way of protecting the towns was to raise the ruinous state in which they were at the time, thus encouraging cattle raising and agriculture. He promoted education, which was extended to girls. He was one of the pioneers in smallpox vaccination. The efficient administration and his capacity for action produced an improvement in various economic aspects such as the production of leathers and yerba mate.

Governor of the Province of Paraguay and the thirty towns of the Missions 
The governor of Paraguay, Lázaro de Ribera, had become a tyrannical, venal official, lacking sincerity and respect for his superiors. Furthermore, since 1789, he harshly opposed to the Viceroy Marquis of Avilés on the complex abolition of the community system of the Guarani peoples and its possible consequences. The controversy continued with the Viceroy del Pino, successor of Avilés since June 1801. In May 1803, the King disposed the abolition of the encomiendas and the liberation of the natives. Félix de Azara, the Spanish official that knew best the land, informed negatively about Ribera. He also suggested that the towns of the Missions, for military, cultural and administrative reasons, should join the Province of Paraguay under one sole governor. He proposed Colonel Velasco for the position.

References

1742 births
1821 deaths
People of the Spanish American wars of independence
19th-century Paraguayan people
People from the Province of Burgos